Ape Escape is a series of animated shorts developed by Frederator Studios, Hawaii Film Partners, Project 51 Productions and Showcase Entertainment which aired on Nicktoons in 2009. It is based on Sony Computer Entertainment's Ape Escape video game franchise, with characters and designs based on Ape Escape 2 in particular, and focuses around Specter's attempts to take over the world with his monkey army.

Development
Frederator obtained the cartoon rights to Ape Escape on May 31, 2007. Various talents were brought in to help, including Doug TenNapel. The character designs are based on Ape Escape 2, with Jimmy as the protagonist. The animations are primarily animated using Adobe Flash. The shorts were completed in 2008 and premiered on Nicktoons on July 5, 2009. The shorts were released on DVD in the United Kingdom by Lions Gate Home Entertainment on February 18, 2013.

Cast

Annie Mumolo as Jimmy, and Natalie
Greg Ellis as Specter
Eric Bauza as Professor and the Pipo Monkeys

See also

Ape Escape (Japanese TV series) – a 2002 series of Ape Escape television shorts that aired on TV Tokyo that is also known by the title Ju Retsu Saru Getchu
Saru Get You -On Air- – a 2006 Japanese anime television series based on the Ape Escape video game franchise

References

External links
 Frederator Studios Ape Escape Blog
 Trailer (Vimeo)
 Official YouTube channel
 
 

Ape Escape
2000s American animated television series
American children's animated adventure television series
American children's animated comedy television series
American children's animated fantasy television series
Animated series based on video games
Nicktoons (TV network) original programming
Frederator Studios
Animated television series about monkeys
Works based on Sony Interactive Entertainment video games